Santiago González and Travis Rettenmaier became the first champions of this tournament, after their 6–2, 6–4 win against Sadik Kadir and Purav Raja in the final.

Seeds

Draw

Draw

References
 Doubles Draw

Due Ponti Cup - Doubles